The Nooksack Valley refers the collection of mountain valleys within the North Cascades centered around Mount Shuksan, Mount Baker and the Twin Sisters, formed by the catchments of the upper Nooksack River and its alpine tributaries (primarily the North Fork, Middle Fork and South Fork).  Roughly covering the western half of Washington state's Whatcom County and a small northern fringe of Skagit County, the Nooksack valleys expands between the Sumas Mountain and Stewart Mountain (between which the valley proper is located) to the west; the Red Mountain, Church Mountain and Goat Mountain in the north; the Ruth Mountain, Icy Peak and Nooksack Cirque in the east; and the Lyman Hill and Mount Josephine in the south.

Out of the three main tributary valleys, the North Fork Valley communicates with the Columbia Valley in the north via a decently wide mountain pass between the Sumas and Red Mountain, where the Washington State Route 547 goes through from Kendall to Peaceful Valley; and the South Fork Valley communicates with the Skagit Valley in the south via a narrow pass between Stewart/Anderson Mountain and Lyman Hill, where the State Route 9 goes through from Saxon to Prairie.

See also
Nooksack River
Nooksack (tribe)
Columbia Valley
Sumas River

Nooksack
Valleys of Washington (state)
Landforms of Whatcom County, Washington